Peter David Windsor (born 11 April 1952) is a Formula One journalist, and former Formula One team and sponsorship manager.

Windsor started his journalism career at the now defunct monthly magazine Competition Car. He was the motorsport editor for the British weekly magazine Autocar from the late 1970s until 1985, and was lauded for his Grand Prix reports.

In 1985, thanks to his close relationship with Nigel Mansell, Windsor became sponsorship manager at Williams. Shortly before the start of the 1986 season, Windsor was in an automobile accident when the car he was riding in with Frank Williams crashed on the way from the Paul Ricard Circuit in southern France to the Nice airport, causing Windsor minor injuries but leaving Williams, who was driving, paralysed. He then worked as general manager for Ferrari's UK base in 1989, only to return to Williams as team manager in 1991.

Most of his early television work took place with networks of Rupert Murdoch's News Corporation. From 1998 to 2000, Windsor was the on-location reporter for Fox Sports Networks' coverage of Formula One. He then joined Sky Sports as a pit reporter on their F1 Digital + package. He also worked as a pit reporter for the American Broadcasting Company's coverage of the 2002 United States Grand Prix. He also returned to WilliamsF1 as the narrator of the museum in the team's Interactive HQ website.

Windsor carried out on-location reports from Formula One venues for Speed, with colleagues Bob Varsha, Steve Matchett, and David Hobbs covering the races from the studio. He traveled to the various race venues to provide interviews with drivers and other F1 personnel during each race weekend.  After the 2006 season, this role increased in prominence with Speed's addition of a live camera on the pre-race grid, where Windsor wandered the grid to conduct pre-race interviews with drivers, race engineers, managers, team principals, FIA personnel and visiting celebrities. He also frequently contributed analysis during the race.

For several seasons Windsor was also the moderator for Formula One's post-qualifying and post-race press conferences. He handed the interviewer's microphone to James Allen from the 2009 British Grand Prix due to a concern over a potential or perceived conflict of interest as a future team boss; but returned to the interview room at the 2009 Italian Grand Prix. He also did reports and phones in from the pitlane before the start of each race for Network Ten (ONE) Australia F1 broadcaster.

Windsor was Grand Prix Editor of the F1 Racing magazine from 1997 to 2009, and is the current senior columnist and feature writer on The Racer's Edge section.

He has spoken out against making changes to Formula 1 to improve the quality of racing by making overtaking easier. He said in 2007: "I would change nothing. I think F1 is fantastic as it is. If you want to watch a million meaningless overtaking manoeuvres and lots of shunts go and watch NASCAR or bikes or IRL or something."

On 4 February 2009, it was reported Windsor and engineer/designer Ken Anderson were to head an American entrant into the 2010 Formula One season called Team US F1. Their application was formally accepted by the FIA on 12 June 2009. Windsor's role would involve team management and driver development and selection. However, in March 2010, USF1 ceased operations after it was revealed that it was a ghost project. On 25 June 2010 the FIA officially banned USF1 from any further participation in the sport, and the World Motor Sport Council fined them US$380,000 for failing to meet their commitments for the 2010 race season.

In 2009 Windsor joined the management team of the inaugural Grand Prix Shootout to find a future Marussia F1 Team test driver for 2013. The winner was Tio Ellinas from Cyprus.

In May 2017, Windsor joined the Motorsport Network to do The Flying Lap with Peter Windsor, a weekly web series about Formula One and other international championships. In 2018, his role at Motorsport Network expanded to include hosting the Motorsport Show and co-hosting Rapid Tech with Craig Scarborough.

Personal life

Windsor was brought up in Australia, but now has residences in London and Sydney. Windsor has won five awards for his writing, including Sports Reporter of the Year and Feature Writer of the Year.

References

External links

Official website

1952 births
Living people
Motorsport announcers
Formula One journalists and reporters
Formula One managers
Motoring journalists
Australian motorsport people